Briery Siding Halt railway station served the workers of Briery Bobbin Mill in Briery, in the historical county of Cumberland, England, from 1922 to 1958 on the Cockermouth, Keswick and Penrith Railway.

History 
The station opened after 1922 by the London, Midland and Scottish Railway. It was situated west of the bridge that led to what is now Low Briery Holiday Park. It was also known as Briery Bobbin Mill Halt. The platform was rebuilt in the 1930s due to the original decaying. The mill closed in 1958 so the station soon followed suit, closing on 17 November 1958. The siding continued to be used, although only being used for coal, until 1959. The platform still exists today.

References 

Disused railway stations in Cumbria
Former London, Midland and Scottish Railway stations
Railway stations in Great Britain opened in 1922
Railway stations in Great Britain closed in 1958
1922 establishments in England
1958 disestablishments in England